The IBM Personal System/55 Note (stylized as PS/55 note) is a series of notebooks manufactured by the IBM subsidiary IBM Japan as part of the IBM Personal System/55 series.

The international IBM PS/2 Note series was based on the PS/55 Note series.

History 
IBM started selling the PS/55 Note series in Japan in April 1991.

Western Digital has supplied video and logic chips for the PS/55 Note.

Models 
 Model N23SX (5523-S) (03/1991) (similar to the PS/2 N33SX and PS/2 N51SX models)
 Model 5535 (1987)
 Model 5535-S (1990)
 Model T22sx (1992)
 Model N27sx (02/1992) (similar to the PS/2 CL57SX model)
 Model C23V (10/1992)
 Model C52 (10/1992) (identical to the ThinkPad 700C)

Reception 
The PS/55 Note was a rapid success in Japan.

References

External links 
 Thinkwiki.de - PS/55 Note

PS/55 Note